Immanuel Kant (1724–1804) was a Prussian philosopher.

Kant may also refer to:

Places
 Kant, Shahjahanpur, Uttar Pradesh, India, a town and nagar panchayat
 Kant, Kyrgyzstan, a city
 Kant Air Base, a Russian base near the city
 7083 Kant, an asteroid
 Kant (crater), a lunar crater

Other uses
 Kant (book), a book by Roger Scruton
 Kant (surname), a list of people and fictional characters
 KANT (FM), a radio station in Gurnsey, Wyoming, United States
 KANT (software), a computer algebra system for mathematicians interested in algebraic number theory
 KANT project, a German-French joint venture for tank construction
 Immanuel Kant Baltic Federal University, a university in Kaliningrad
 FC Kant, a football club based in Kant, Kyrgyzstan
 Kant Hotel, Bryant, South Dakota, United States, on the National Register of Historic Places

See also
Cant (disambiguation)
Kante (disambiguation)